Sukhamo Devi is a 1986 Indian Malayalam-language romantic drama film  written and directed by Venu Nagavally in his directorial debut. The story was based on his own life's experience. It features Mohanlal, Shankar, Geetha and Urvashi in major roles. The film features songs composed by Raveendran and a score by M. B. Sreenivasan.

Plot 
Two good friends, Nandan and Sunny, are singers in their senior year of college. Nandan is a hard working introvert while Sunny is well rounded, sporty, and loved among his friends. Nandan and Sunny have girlfriends Devi and Thara, respectively, who match them exactly in personality. Sunny also has another very loyal pal named Vinod who tends to get a bit annoying sometimes, but Sunny appreciates him nevertheless.

When Sunny and Nandan graduate college with highest honors, they decide to marry their girlfriends. Thara's parents approve of Sunny, but Devi's father does not of approve Nandan when he sees that Nandan works as waiter at a restaurant. Devi's father even decides to have an arranged marriage for her, about which Nandan and Sunny get really upset. Sunny promises that he would convince Devi's father to change his mind. Sunny plans to get Nandan and Devi married at a register office with the help of Chandran to get Devi out of her house in disguise of a temple visit. However, things still stay the same, and Devi's arranged marriage goes on as planned.

On the morning of Devi's wedding, worse turns to worst when news arrives telling that Sunny got killed in a motorbike accident with Vinod in a critical condition at the hospital. It is later discovered that Vinod survives the accident, but loses his ability to talk. Thara gets extremely devastated and starts living as a widow. Nandan obeys Sunny's wish for him to be a playback singer for movies, and eventually gains fame and wealth from doing so. Sunny's brother introduces Nandan to a music director who promotes him in the film world. From this part of the movie to the end, all of the characters hear Sunny's voice in random places, making them feel his presence in their hearts.

On one of Nandan's tours to his hometown, he stays in a hotel and discovers that the receptionist is Devi. He calls her later, telling her, "Sukhamo Devi?" (Are you doing alright, Devi?), the title of the movie. He eventually meets her husband, Dr. Venugopal, who tells Nandan to move on with life, and that the arranged marriage wasn't his choice either.

Meanwhile, Nandan tries to cheer up Thara, who has yet to recover from the shock of Sunny's death. Devi, along with her daughter, leaves for Goa to be with her husband for good with Nandan promising her that they will unite in Heaven one day. The final scene shows Nandan and Thara watching Devi's plane leave with Sunny's voice telling Nandan to "look after Thara like gold". At that moment, Nandan and Thara decide to get married until they reunite with their true loves in Heaven. The movie ends with the words "A practical solution for a love tragedy" on the screen.

Cast 
 Shankar as Nandan
 Mohanlal as Sunny
 Urvashi as Devi
 Geetha as Thara
 Jagathy Sreekumar as Vinod
 Janardhanan as Ouseppachan, Thara's brother
 Jagannatha Varma as Krishnan, Devi's father
 Sukumari as Radhika, Devi's mother
 K. B. Ganesh Kumar as Chandran, Devi's brother
 M. G. Soman as Dr. Ambikadmajan Nair
 K. P. A. C. Sunny as Stephen, Sunny's brother
 Priya
 Shankaradi as Fauji Rajashekharan
 Thikkurissy Sukumaran Nair as Alexander, Sunny's father
 Kaviyoor Ponnamma as Nandan's mother
 Santhakumari
 Sumithra as Sunny's sister-in-law
 Nedumudi Venu as Dr. Venugopal, Devi's husband (cameo)
 Venu Nagavally as Man at the bar (guest appearance)

Production 
Sukhamo Devi marks the directorial debut of Venu Nagavally. The film is based on his own life experience.

Soundtrack 
The soundtrack was composed by music Raveendran to the lyrics penned by O. N. V. Kurup. The soundtrack was well received and includes in the evergreen melodies of all time in Malayalam film music. K. J. Yesudas and K. S. Chithra have lent their voice for the soundtracks of the film.

References

External links 

Article about the film in Deepika

1980s Malayalam-language films
1986 directorial debut films
1986 films
1986 romantic drama films
Indian romantic drama films
Indian films based on actual events
Films scored by Raveendran
Films scored by M. B. Sreenivasan
Films shot in Thiruvananthapuram
Films directed by Venu Nagavally